The OnePlus Pad is an Android-based tablet computer designed, marketed, and manufactured by OnePlus. It was announced on February 7, 2023.

References

External links 

Android (operating system) devices
Tablet computers introduced in 2023